Mount Vic 3005 m (9859 ft), prominence: 712 m, is a mountain in the Chilcotin Ranges of the Central Interior of British Columbia, Canada, located east of the southernmost of the Taseko Lakes and southeast of Taseko Mountain.  Adjoining its lower slopes to the northeast is the Dil-Dil Plateau, a lava plateau rising above the main Chilcotin Plateau, which extends north and northeast in general from this area, which is to the west of the headwaters of Big Creek.  Mount Vic is one of the highest summits of the southern Chilcotin Ranges, which are a subrange of the Pacific Ranges subdivision of the Coast Mountains.

See also
Big Creek Provincial Park
Spruce Lake Protected Area

References

Canadian Mountain Encyclopedia entry

Chilcotin Ranges
Landforms of the Chilcotin
Three-thousanders of British Columbia
Lillooet Land District